The 1995 Indiana State Sycamores football team represented Indiana State University as a member of the Gateway Football Conference during the 1995 NCAA Division I-AA football season. Led by 16th-year head coach Dennis Raetz, the Sycamores compiled an overall record of 7–4 with a mark of 3–3 in conference play, tying for third place in the Gateway. Indiana State played home games at Memorial Stadium in Terre Haute, Indiana.

Three Sycamores were named All-American after the season. Dan Brandenburg, defensive end was selected to the first team by The Sporting News and American Football Coaches Association; he was a third team pick by the Associated Press. Placekicker Tom Allison and linebacker Chris Libaire were named by Don Hansen's Football Guide to its and first and second teams, respectively. Brandenburg was selected in the seventh round of the 1996 NFL Draft by the Buffalo Bills and spent five seasons career in the National Football League (NFL), four with the Bills before a short stint on the practice squad of the Philadelphia Eagles.

Schedule

References

Indiana State
Indiana State Sycamores football seasons
Indiana State Sycamores football